College of Information Technology and Engineering (CITE), affiliated to Purbanchal University, popularly known as CIT, was established in 2000, the first college in Nepal offering Information Technology (IT) Education. CITE is centrally located at Subidhanagar, Tinkune, Kathmandu. Currently CITE offers bachelor level education on Information Technology, Engineering and Management.

Courses offered

CITE offers Bachelor level courses in the following disciplines:

Engineering

 Bachelor of Computer Engineering (BE Computer) - 4 Years/8 Semesters

Information Technology

 Bachelor of Computer Application (BCA) - 4 Years/8 Semesters
 Bachelor of Information Technology (BIT) - 4 Years/8 Semesters

Management

 Bachelor of Business Administration (BBA) - 4 Years/8 Semesters

Eligibility Criteria
 For Engineering: Minimum 45% in +2 in Science or equivalent degree.
 For Information Technology: Minimum 45% in +2 or equivalent degree (for BIT 100 Marks math mandatory)
 For Management: Minimum Second division in +2 or equivalent degree.

CITE offers Masters level courses in the following disciplines:
 Master of Information Technology (MIT) 2 Years/ 4 Semester

References

External links
 Purbanchal University "AFFILIATED COLLEGES"
 College of Information Technology and Engineering "IT Colleges ranking in Nepal", Everest List, Nepal, 2015. Retrieved on 2 October 2015.
 College of Information Technology and Engineering "SCHOOLS & COLLEGES", Educate Nepal, Nepal, 2015. Retrieved on 2 October 2015.
 College of Information Technology and Engineering "IT Colleges in Nepal", Colleges, Nepal, 2015. Retrieved on 2 October 2015.

Universities and colleges in Nepal